The Wu River is a left tributary of the Yuan River in south China. This upper stream is called Wuyang River in Guizhou Province; it rises on the western slopes of Mount Foding in the southeast of Weng'an County. The river runs eastward into Hunan Province and then is called the Wu River. It joins Yuan River at Hongjiang City.

Notes

Rivers of Guizhou
Rivers of Hunan